Holborn Head is a headland on the north-facing Atlantic coast of Caithness, in the Highland area of Scotland. It has a lighthouse at its south end and the remains of an old fort at its tip.

Hill fort 
The name Holborn appears Norse in origin, meaning hillfort, and the headland may be the Tarvedunum promotorium noted by Ptolemy. At the tip is a bank, all that remains of a promontory fort, which has been listed as a protected monument since 1933. One source says no radiocarbon dating, or excavation for stratified remains has been done at the fort, so its age is unknown. Another says it is Early Bronze Age to Pictish, possibly 2400 BC to 900 AD, and another says Count Moddan, one of the Earls of Orkney, in the early 11th century, had his army on promontario Thorsnesia, which its source takes to be Holburn Head. However, Thurso promontory could have equally described the later Scrabster Castle.

Lighthouse 
A walk around the headland can be accessed through a gate next to the Principal Keeper's House. There are stiles and bridges, which allow access to the unfenced off promontory of Holborn Head itself. There are clear views over to Dunnet Head and to the Orkney Islands.

Designed and built by David and Thomas Stevenson, it was completed in 1862. The tower for the light is integral with the keepers' house which is unusual since most Scottish lighthouses are separate from the house. After entering the upper floor front doorway there is a vestibule with 2 entrances, one to the Lightkeepers House and the other to the Lighthouse Tower. There were 2 Lightkeepers houses and the Tower within the building. Separate to this was the Principal Keeper's House.

The light was discontinued in 2003.

References 

 Northern Lighthouse Board's link on the Holborn Head Lighthouse
Panorama of Holburn Head Lighthouse (QuickTime required)
The History of the Celtic Placenames of Scotland (Watson, 2004)
 Weekend Notes article describing access to the walk around Holborn Head promontory

Headlands of Scotland
Sites of Special Scientific Interest in Caithness
Landforms of Highland (council area)